Chrysorabdia aurantiaca is a moth of the subfamily Arctiinae. It is found in India (Assam).

References

Lithosiini